Dawuane "D.J." Smoot (born March 2, 1995) is an American football defensive end for the Jacksonville Jaguars of the National Football League (NFL). He played college football at Illinois.

Early years
Smoot attended Groveport Madison High School in Groveport, Ohio. During his high school career, he had 260 tackles and 30 sacks. He committed to the University of Illinois to play college football.

College career
Smoot played in seven games as a true freshman at Illinois in 2013, recording eight tackles and one sack. As a sophomore in 2014 he played in all 13 games and had 33 tackles and 2.5 sacks. As a junior in 2015 he started all 12 games, recording 40 tackles, eight sacks and three forced fumbles. On November 29, 2016, Smoot was named Third-team All-Big Ten by the coaches and media.

Professional career
Smoot contemplated leaving Illinois after his junior season and received a second round grade for the 2016 NFL Draft from the NFL advisory board. He decided to stay for his senior year and was the 24th overall prospect on Todd McShay's big board heading into 2017. He received an invitation to the 2017 Senior Bowl and practiced well throughout the week. He played defensive end for the North, but was held without a tackle as the North were defeated 16-15 by the South. Smoot attended the NFL Combine and completed most of the combine and positional drills, but decided to not perform the bench press. He also participated at Illinois' Pro Day and chose to perform the bench and have another attempt at the vertical. NFL draft experts and analysts projected him to be selected in the third or fourth round. He was ranked the 15th best defensive end available in the draft by NFLDraftScout.com.

Smoot was selected by the Jacksonville Jaguars in the third round (68th overall) of the 2017 NFL Draft.  Smoot made the Jaguars team and played in all 16 regular season games, as well as Jacksonville's three playoff games.

In week 3 of the 2019 season, Smoot recorded his first two career sacks on Marcus Mariota in the 20–7 win.

Smoot signed a two-year, $10 million contract extension with the Jaguars on March 16, 2021.

NFL career statistics

Regular season

Personal life
On October 19, 2021, Smoot helped his wife Aumari deliver the couple's second child at home, after she fell on the way to the hospital. The couple has a two-year old son, Ahmir.

References

External links
Jacksonville Jaguars bio
Illinois Fighting Illini bio

1995 births
Living people
Players of American football from Ohio
American football defensive ends
Illinois Fighting Illini football players
Jacksonville Jaguars players
People from Groveport, Ohio